Scissor Seven (also known as Killer 7) is a Chinese streaming television animated series. It was released internationally under the name Scissor Seven on Netflix. A film sequel to the series' third season was announced at the end of the season's final episode. The fourth season premiered in January 18, 2023. A film sequel to the series' fourth season was announced at the end of the seasons' final episode.

Plot
The clumsy and broke Seven fails a crash course in professional killing and opens a barber shop on Chicken Island as a disguise. He then decides to become an assassin, and gets stuck in a power struggle between two rivaling factions while he tries to recover his lost memories.

Characters
 
 
 The protagonist of the series, also known commonly as Seven. A hairdresser whose real identity is a fearsome nameless assassin, but loses his memory due to unknown reasons. His current name is given by Ji Dabao, who is also his saviour when he loses his memory. He is ranked 17369th in the assassin list, though his real ability means he is far more powerful than the current rank he obtains. His real identity before the memory loss is one of the seven powerful shadow assassin of the Xuanwu Kingdom, with his codename is Qi (柒). Despite memory loss, he is able to manipulate his scissor, which allows him to make the scissor as lethal as his real deadly sword. When he is in coma, his memory is temporarily restored, with his power doubled than the original, with his voice also changes from Mandarin to Cantonese. He has an oddly romantic relationship with Plum Blossom Thirteen. After the end of the 2nd season, he decides to return to Xuanwu Kingdom to find out what happened to his past.

 
 
 The unnamed youngest daughter of Plum Blossom Master. She has a strained relationship with her father, as her mother divorces from him due to his obsession with having a son, her dad having only thirteen daughters prior to bringing a new wife and his first son. She loses her mother due to a murder, before a hired assassin (who is later revealed as Qing Feng) comes to avenge her mother, causing Thirteen to seek Qing Feng for training and has vowed to defeat all men, be it her father or else. She is tasked in murdering Seven and bring in the legendary sword, but her attempts tend to be disrupted in comical reasons, including a moment of kissing. However, Seven is the only person who does not care about her past and treats her like a normal girl, which emotionally changes her heart, and she harbours her feeling toward Seven since. Toward the end of the second season, she is one of the people to realise Seven's true identity.

 
 
 The manager of Wu Liuqi's barber shop, and also the person who saves Wu Liuqi's life two years ago. Although having a chicken-like appearance, he is in fact, a very powerful person, capable of transforming into anything if this is useful for his assassination task, usually given to Wu Liuqi instead. He has previously killed King Pheasant, who murders his friend, before freeing himself from the farm life and becomes an independent person.

 
 
 Dabao's adopted son. A mixed hybrid between his late father and an unnamed pigeon, he is often around with his adoptive father.

Episodes

Series overview

Season 1 (2018)

Season 2 (2019)

Season 3 (2021)

Season 4 (2023)

Notes

References

2018 Chinese television series debuts
Chinese adult animated comedy television series
Animated television series by Netflix